The Moro Resistance and Liberation Organization (MRLO) is an active armed secessionist group participating in the Moro conflict. It was established by the National Democratic Front (NDF) as one of its Moro subdivisions, and was the 16th organization created by the NDF to fight under its leadership. The group has openly and consistently condemned the Philippine government's military operations in Mindanao, accusing them of violence against Moro civilians.

References

Guerrilla organizations
Military history of the Philippines
Moro conflict
National Democratic Front of the Philippines
Separatism in the Philippines
Secessionist organizations in Asia
Members of the Unrepresented Nations and Peoples Organization
Rebel groups in the Philippines